Adult Contemporary is a chart published by Billboard ranking the top-performing songs in the United States in the adult contemporary music (AC) market.  In 1971, 19 songs topped the chart, then published under the title Easy Listening, based on playlists submitted by easy listening radio stations and sales reports submitted by stores.

In the issue of Billboard dated January 2, "One Less Bell to Answer" by The 5th Dimension moved into the number one position, replacing "It's Impossible" by Perry Como.  The song held the top spot for a single week before being replaced by Bobby Goldsboro's "Watching Scotty Grow".  Goldsboro's song topped the chart for six consecutive weeks, the year's longest unbroken run at number one.  The Carpenters spent the most total weeks at number one in 1971, occupying the top spot for a total of nine weeks with "For All We Know", "Rainy Days and Mondays" and "Superstar".  The brother-sister duo was the only act to achieve three number ones during the year; The 5th Dimension and Bread were the only other acts to take more than one single to the top of the chart in 1971.

Two of 1971's Easy Listening number ones also topped Billboards all-genre singles chart, the Hot 100, both written, solely or in part, by Carole King.  King spent five weeks atop the Easy Listening chart in June and July with "It's Too Late", for which she wrote the music but not the lyrics.  It was immediately followed into the top spot by James Taylor's recording of  "You've Got a Friend", written entirely by King, which spent a single week at number one.  The two songs each spent the same number of weeks at number one on the Hot 100.  Taylor's song was followed into the top spot by Olivia Newton-John's cover version of Bob Dylan's "If Not for You", the first major hit for the Australian singer who would achieve considerable U.S. chart success during the 1970s in both the pop and country fields.  The final Easy Listening number one of 1971 was "All I Ever Need Is You" by Sonny & Cher.

Chart history

References

See also
1971 in music
List of artists who reached number one on the U.S. Adult Contemporary chart

1971
1971 record charts